The Kullsberg Limestone is a geologic formation in Norway and Sweden. It preserves fossils dating back to the Ordovician period.

See also

 List of fossiliferous stratigraphic units in Norway
 List of fossiliferous stratigraphic units in Sweden

References
 

Geologic formations of Norway
Ordovician System of Europe
Ordovician Norway
Limestone formations
Paleontology in Norway
Geologic formations of Sweden
Ordovician Sweden
Paleontology in Sweden